Cezary Stefan Wilk (born 12 February 1986) is a Polish retired footballer who played as a defensive midfielder.

Club career

Wilk was born in Warsaw. He played in hometown's Polonia Warsaw's youth setup, but left the club in 2005 and subsequently joined Korona Kielce. Wilk played his first match as a professional on 15 October 2005, aged 19, and eventually represented his side for five years, playing 74 official games and scoring five goals. In 2007, he was loaned to ŁKS Łódź, appearing in 14 matches during his six-month spell.

In 2010 Wilk agreed to a four-year deal with Wisła Kraków, and was a part of the squad which was crowned champions in the following year. He remained at the club for almost four years and made 106 appearances, scoring 7 goals in all competitions.

On 13 August 2013, Wilk moved abroad for the first time in his career, agreeing to a two-year deal with Spanish Segunda División side Deportivo de La Coruña. He appeared in 19 matches as Dépor returned to La Liga at the first attempt.

On 7 July 2015, Wilk joined Real Zaragoza on a two-year contract. On 20 March 2018, after severely struggling with injuries, he announced his retirement.

International career
Having represented Poland at the U-21 and U-23 levels, Wilk was called up in December 2010 to the main squad for a match against Bosnia and Herzegovina. He made his debut on the 10th, replacing Ariel Borysiuk in the 62nd minute of an eventual 2–2 draw.

Honours

Wisła Kraków
Ekstraklasa: 2010–11

Statistics

See also
 Wilk – people with the surname Wilk

References

External links
 

1986 births
Living people
Footballers from Warsaw
Polish footballers
Poland international footballers
Poland under-21 international footballers
Polish expatriate footballers
Association football midfielders
Ekstraklasa players
La Liga players
Segunda División players
Korona Kielce players
ŁKS Łódź players
Wisła Kraków players
Deportivo de La Coruña players
Real Zaragoza players
Polish expatriate sportspeople in Spain
Expatriate footballers in Spain